Thomas O'Toole was a science reporter and editor at The Washington Post from 1966 to 1987. His main subject was the space program, in particular the Apollo program to land men on the moon. He extensively covered Skylab, the Apollo-Soyuz Test Project, the Voyager program to Jupiter, Saturn and Uranus, and the Space Shuttle program. O'Toole wrote many articles on energy, including the burgeoning nuclear power industry in America. He also covered significant espionage stories, from Cold War subjects to Watergate and the hunt for Nazi figures hiding in America and elsewhere after World War 2.

Early life
O'Toole was born in 1931 in Jersey City and he attended high school and college at St. Peter's Prep (Hoboken) and St. Peter's College (now St. Peter's University, Jersey City). After military service in France, he earned a graduate journalism degree from Boston University and then worked at The Cape Cod Standard Times (now The Cape Cod Times) in Hyannis, reporting on the Andrea Doria ocean liner sinking of 1956. O'Toole returned to New York City, finding work with The Wall Street Journal (1957–1961), TIME magazine, and The New York Times (1965–66). He was a partner in the 1962 aerospace and culture magazine USA1, which published five issues before folding. He married Vitaline O'Connell, of Hartford, in 1958 and they had four children.

Newspaper career
In the summer of 1966, Howard Simons and Ben Bradlee of The Washington Post hired Tom O'Toole, as The Post was growing into a paper of national prominence. O'Toole immediately began covering the Lunar Orbiter program from the Jet Propulsion Laboratory in Pasadena. From there, his work covered aspects of the space program. His articles were frequently featured on the front page of the paper. O'Toole was twice nominated for the Pulitzer Prize and he was awarded the National Space Club Press Award in 1970.

Around 1980, O'Toole was invited to work with Marvin Cetron on Cetron's first book about the future, Encounters with the Future. Cetron and O'Toole were both contributors to Omni, which collected some of the best science news and writing of the time. Cetron's sweeping predictions, largely gained from his insider position at the Navy Advanced Research Laboratory, were put into context and prose by O'Toole, who brought his own working knowledge of science to the project. The book was published by McGraw-Hill in 1982.

O'Toole continued to cover space and energy, among other subjects, for The Washington Post. He visited Three Mile Island during the 1979 crisis at the Pennsylvania nuclear facility. He detailed the space shuttle program from its infancy, although he was in Pasadena covering deep space probe Voyager's encounter with Uranus when the shuttle Challenger blew up in January 1986. The Washington Post published a book later that year called Challengers: The Inspiring Life Stories of the Seven Brave Astronauts of Shuttle Mission 51-L, with 12 Post reporters contributing. O'Toole wrote Chapter One.

On December 30, 1983, he wrote the article "Possibly as Large as Jupiter" in the Washington Post, which brought to the mainstream, the idea that another planet or object in our Solar System is to be discovered, and that we are in a complex and still mysterious Solar System.

Later life and career
O'Toole worked for several years at public relations firm Powell-Tate in Washington. He was also an early editor and contributor to space.com. He married a second time, to Mary Kate Cranston of Washington. They had one child. Tom O'Toole died in 2003 from complications from diabetes.

References

American male journalists
Writers from Jersey City, New Jersey
American editors
1931 births
2003 deaths
Saint Peter's University alumni
American newspaper reporters and correspondents
American science journalists
20th-century American journalists
The Washington Post people
Boston University College of Communication alumni